Egypt Sherrod is an American radio and television personality, as well as real estate broker. She is best known as host of HGTV's Flipping Virgins and its long running show, Property Virgins.  She is also the CEO of the Atlanta-based Egypt Sherrod Real Estate Group.

Early life and education
Egypt Sherrod was born on November 16, 1976, in Philadelphia, Pennsylvania. Growing up in her grandparents' home, she slept in a closet that only fit her bed; as a child she dreamed to one day have a closet that was bigger than her bedroom.

She earned a Bachelor of Arts degree in broadcasting and telecommunications from Temple University. She also studied theater at New York University's Tisch School of the Arts. She holds the designation of Master Certified Negotiator, Accredited Buyer Representative, Certified Residential Specialist and Certified Distressed Property Expert.

Career
Sherrod began hosting on a jazz station at 18. At 19, she got a job as a radio station music director—the youngest in the country. Growing up with a father and uncle who were real estate brokers, she saw real estate  as a way to earn retirement money and as a "fallback" to her career in radio. She bought her first home at 24-years-old. Much of her profits were going to fees for her real estate agents, so she became a licensed agent in 2002. She was also a correspondent on the Maury show.

She was the number one radio personality for New York City’s WBLS 107.5, where she interviewed Prince, Tyler Perry, and Oprah. The program was syndicated in more than 60 cities throughout the US. Her access to celebrities elevated her real estate clientele. Growing tired of "gossip and entertainment reports," she thought about transitioning out of radio. She relates that, while hosting her show, she got a call from a casting director who was exploring Sherrod's interest in hosting a program that would become Property Virgins. She agreed to audition and secured the role. Four episodes into filming, however, she learned that she was pregnant and, fearing she may lose her job, hid it from the producers. To her delight, it was not an issue. With a child on the way, she considered the challenge of maintaining a work/life balance in New York and, desiring something new, she considered making a change. In March 2012, Sherrod accepted an offer to be  the midday host of WVEE V-103 in Atlanta. a city she had frequented as a child when visiting relatives. While there, she conducted interviews with celebrities, including Keith Sweat, Musiq Soulchild, Jazze Pha, The Braxtons and Marsha Ambrosius. The show Property Virgins moved to Atlanta to accommodate her, and she began filming on the weekends. However, overwhelmed with the demands of her family life and career, as well as a bout of postpartum depression, she left her job with the radio station.

She has made recurring appearances as the home buyers/sellers “go-to girl” on NBC's Today Show, CNBC, FOX, CNN, HLN as well as being featured on Fast & Company, Yahoo, Homes.com, Rolling Stone, Black Enterprise, and a host of other publications and digital platforms. She wrote Keep Calm...It's Just Real Estate: Your No-Stress Guide To Buying A Home,” on Running Press/Perseus Books which became a bestseller in its genre.

She stars in the 2012 film Life, Love, Soul. Sherrod has hosted HGTV’s "White House Christmas Special", the Rose Parade, and the HGTV "Urban Oasis" Giveaways. Prior to hosting for HGTV, Sherrod also hosted "Home Delivery" for Tribune's syndicated networks.

Sherrod has been sought out as a speaker and moderator. She hosted the stage at Oprah's "The Life You Want Tour." Sherrod has been invited as a recurring ‘Hot Topics’ guest and lifestyle pundit on programs such as Dish Nation, Steve Harvey, Showbiz Tonight, and Larry Wilmore Show. Sherrod will host the reunion special of the television soap opera series from the Oprah Winfrey Network, The Haves and the Have Nots, airing as part of the program's series finale package on July 27, 2021, and August 3, 2021.

Since 2022, she has starred with her husband Mike Jackson in HGTV's Married to Real Estate, renovating fixer-uppers into a client's dream home. The couple served as judges on Season 2 of HGTV's Rock the  Block and were competitors in Season 3.

Accolades
Sherrod has also received the Humanitarian Citation from the Borough of New York, State Assembly Citation as a Humanitarian and Community Advocate, as well as the New York City Council Citation for Community Service. She was nominated for an NAACP Image Award for her book "Keep Calm It's Just Real Estate", received the MISSION Award from WEEN (Women In Entertainment Empowerment Network), and was named one of Network Journal's "40 Under 40," and #2 in Radio and Records’ "Power Player on the Rise" Top 10 list, 105.1 FM, May 14, 2006, and also received the "Executive to Watch" Award from NABFEME (National Association of Black Female Executives in Music & Entertainment). She was chosen as one of Network Journal's 40 Under 40.

Personal life
In 2008, Sherrod founded The Egypt Cares Family Foundation, a non-profit dedicated to financial empowerment and awareness. The “rising stars boot camp” is designed for children aged 8–17 who want to work in radio and television. The "Egypt Cares Give Back Tour" is an annual coat and toy drive, which has garnered proclamations from the Brooklyn President at the time, Marty Markowitz.

Sherrod married Mike Jackson, a DJ who goes by Fadelf, on September 11, 2010. Sherrod and Jackson have two daughters together: Kendall (born in January 2012) and Harper (born February 2019). Jackson has a daughter from a previous relationship.

FilmographyDish Nation – Guest hostHome Delivery – Co-hostProperty Virgins (2012–present) – HostFlipping Virgins (2012–present) – HostAll-Star Halloween Special (2015) – HostGood Morning America (2016)Brother Vs. Brother (2016–present) – Celebrity judgeHome & Family (2016) – Guest hostWhite House Christmas Special (2016) – HostSteve Harvey (2017)Urban Oasis (2017-2018) – HostMarried to Real Estate (2022–present) - Host

PodcastsLittle Black Dress with Rocsi Diaz and Nina Parker (2017) – GuestRedefining Wealth with Patrice Washington (2018) – Guest

BibliographyKeep Calm.. It’s Just Real Estate''

References

External links

Real Estate Website

1975 births
African-American radio personalities
African-American television personalities
Living people
Television personalities from Philadelphia
Temple University alumni
Tisch School of the Arts alumni